The Fujifilm X-E1 is a digital rangefinder-style mirrorless camera announced by Fujifilm on September 6, 2012. It is the second camera announced for Fujifilm's X-system, after the Fujifilm X-Pro1.

The X-E1 is a slimmed-down version of X-Pro1. The modifications include removal of expensive hybrid finder replaced by an upgraded electronic viewfinder. New EVF uses a 2.36M dot OLED unit, out-speccing the X-Pro1's 1.44M dot LCD finder.

References

http://www.dpreview.com/products/fujifilm/slrs/fujifilm_xe1/specifications

X-E1
Cameras introduced in 2012